Dianthus knappii, or Knapp's carnation, in Bosnian  Knapov karanfil or Knapov klinčić,  is a perennial herbaceous plant in the carnation family, Caryophyllaceae.  It is endemic at Dinaric mountains, on the border area between  Herzegovina (Bosnia and Herzegovina) and Montenegro. In chromosome set has 2n = 30.

Description
The height of the flowering stalk is about 40 cm, erected and slightly hairy. The leaves are linear-lanceolate in whole edge, length is about 15 mm, and a width of about 2–4 mm. 
This carnation formed globulous peak cluster (dichasia). The cup is a herbaceous in narrowing the sense that it can be longer. The petals are long about 7 mm, sulphurous-yellow forward improperly serrated. The flowers have the 10 stamens. It blooms in May and June. The fruit is a wiry cylindrical sleeve, which opens with four prongs, but it is more dark seeds.

Ecology and distribution
Knapp's carnation inhabits xerothermal areas on the edges of karst forest and groves, such as forest glades and clearings, with dry grassland vegetation on limestone bedrock. Its habitats typically have extreme sunny exposure, making it a typical heliophyte.

It is widespread in the Bosnia and Herzegovina (Herzegovina) and Montenegro.

Locus classicus is the Herzegovina: Necvijeće, near Trebinje.

References

Flora of Bosnia and Herzegovina
Flora of Europe
knappii
Taxa named by Paul Friedrich August Ascherson
Taxa named by August Kanitz
Taxa named by Vincze von Borbás